is a form of sumo played by women.

Professional sumo traditionally forbids women from competition and ceremonies. Women are not allowed to enter or touch the sumo wrestling ring (dohyō). Despite this, women sumo wrestlers have existed through history and exist in the present day on an amateur level.

History
The first recorded instance of women performing sumo, according to the Nihon Shoki, is when Emperor Yuryaku (418–479) summoned two courtesans and ordered them to wear loincloths and to sumo wrestle.

Women's sumo would not become common until the 18th century in the middle of Edo (1603–1868), when a form of onna sumo was performed in some areas of Japan. Various types of women's sumo existed, including touring professionals. These continued to exist after the Meiji Restoration, until women's sumo was cracked down upon by the Tokugawa shogunate and Meiji government, as they deemed the organizers of it to be corrupting public morals with these spectacles.

Women's sumo continued to exist despite a government ban in 1926. The practice would only die after the end of World War II, with the last group dissolving in 1963.

Modern times

Female sumo is not considered to be authentic by most Japanese and is now prohibited from taking place in professional settings, but exists on an amateur level.

The International Sumo Federation and its events (such as the Sumo World Championships and European Sumo Championships) allow female competitors. Women's Sumo is an event at the World Games and was also featured at the 2013 World Combat Games.

The first national championship for amateur women's sumo was held in 1997. The rules are identical to professional sumo, with the exception that the wrestlers wear leotards under a mawashi, and the matches last three minutes instead of five minutes like the ones in professional sumo.

Notable female sumo wrestlers

 Hiyori Kon
 Miki Satoyama
 Sharran Alexander
 Julia Dorny
 Hetal Dave
 Edyta Witkowska
 Seika Izawa
 Epp Mäe
 Anna Zhigalova
 Vera Koval
 Svitlana Iaromka
 Sandra Köppen
 Maryna Pryshchepa
 Yonamine Chiru
 Françoise Harteveld

In popular media
  a 2018 Japanese film about women's sumo wrestling in the 1920s.
It won the 1992 Broadcasting Culture Fund Award Main Award and the 1992 Television ATP Award Excellence Award. Nana Kinomi, who plays the role of Hanamidori Master, won the 18th Broadcasting Culture Fund Award Performance Award. 
 Women's Sumo is the subject of the manga Rikijo (りきじょ), written and illustrated by Utamaro and published in Gekkan Action between 2013 and 2015.
 In video games, Hinako Shijou from SNK's The King of Fighters series is a female sumo wrestler and one of the limited examples in the medium. She debuted in The King of Fighters 2000 as part of the "Woman Fighters Team".
 In the film Sumo Do, Sumo Don't, a woman character pretends to be a male sumo wrestler.

See also
 Little Miss Sumo, documentary from 2018.
 Controversies in professional sumo

References

Bibliography
 Seeing Stars: Sports Celebrity, Identity, and Body Culture in Modern Japan (2010, Dennis J. Frost)
 Japanese Women and Sport: Beyond Baseball and Sumo (2011, Robin Kietlinski)
 Martial Arts of the World: An Encyclopedia of History and Innovation, Volume 2 (2010, Green & Svinth)
 Women's Sumo Folk Magazine-Cross-border Performing Arts (October 2012, Yoshie Kamei)
 Folk History of Sumo (August 1996, Tomoko Yamada )

Sumo
Women's sports